Beyond Silent Spring: Integrated Pest Management and Chemical Safety is a 1996 book about environmentalism edited by H. F. van Emden and David Peakall. It is a follow up to the influential 1962 book Silent Spring.

References

1996 non-fiction books
Environmental non-fiction books